The standard scale is a system in Commonwealth law whereby financial criminal penalties (fines) in legislation have maximum levels set against a standard scale. Then, when inflation makes it necessary to increase the levels of the fines the legislators need to modify only the scale rather than every individual piece of legislation.

In English law, the reference in legislation will typically appear as:

Legislation and level of fines

Australia 
In Australia, the monetary fines for a breach of law is determined by however many penalty units the offence is worth, times the value of that jurisdiction's penalty unit. All states and territories set their own penalty unit values, which is supplemented by the federal penalty unit for federal offences.

Channel Islands

Guernsey 

Guernsey uses the UK standard scale for adopted UK legislation, and its own scale (called the uniform scale) for legislation originating in the States of Guernsey.

Guernsey's dependencies of Alderney and Sark have their own distinct scales, although these are generally in line with the Guernsey scale.

 The Uniform Scale of Fines (Bailiwick of Guernsey) Law 1989
 Criminal Justice Act 1982 (Guernsey) Order 1992

Alderney 

 The Uniform Scale of Fines (Alderney) Law 1989 as amended by The Uniform Scale of Fines (Alderney) (Amendment) Ordinance 2007.

Sark 

Sark has its own standard scale, which is normally maintained at the same levels as Guernsey's.

 The Uniform Scale of Fines (Sark) Law, 1989 as amended by the Uniform Scale of Fines (Sark) (Amendment) Ordinance, 1992, the Uniform Scale of Fines (Sark) (Amendment) Ordinance, 2004, and the Uniform Scale of Fines (Sark) (Amendment) Ordinance, 2006.

Isle of Man 

 Since 1 January 2018, for Acts of Tynwald the Isle of Man uses a standard scale introduced by Section 55 of the Interpretation Act 2015. It replaced specified amounts specified within each piece of legislation.

Above amounts .

In respect of Acts of Parliament that extend to the Isle of Man the UK standard scale is used.

 Interpretation Act 2015 (An Act of Tynwald)
 Criminal Justice Act 1982 (An Act of Parliament) as extended to the Island by the Criminal Justice Act 1982 (Isle of Man) Order 1983, and amended by the Criminal Justice Act 1982 (Isle of Man) Order 1992.

Jersey 

 Criminal Justice (Standard Scale of Fines) (Jersey) Law 1993
 Criminal Justice (Miscellaneous Provisions) (Jersey) Law 2016

Above amounts .

Historic

United Kingdom 
Schedule 1 to the Interpretation Act 1978 defines "the standard scale" for each United Kingdom jurisdiction with reference to the following statutes.

The "statutory maximum", which is the maximum fine which can be imposed by a summary court for a triable either way statutory offence, is similarly defined by the Interpretation Act 1978 so as to correspond to the "prescribed sum" (in effect to the maximum (level 5) fine on the standard scale, except in Scotland).

England and Wales 
 
 Criminal Justice Act 1982, section 37, (as amended by Criminal Justice Act 1991, section 17(1))

Scotland 

The setting of the levels of the standard scale of fines in Scotland is a matter devolved to the Scottish Government.

 Criminal Procedure (Scotland) Act 1995, section 225

With effect from 10 December 2007, the Criminal Proceedings etc. Reform (Scotland) Act 2007 increased the "prescribed sum", and with it the "statutory maximum" from £5,000 to £10,000. The level of fines on the standard scale was unaltered.

Northern Ireland 
 Fines and Penalties (Northern Ireland) Order 1984, article 5 (as amended by Criminal Justice (Northern Ireland) Order 1994, article 3(2))

Scale 

The above amounts apply with respect to offences committed on or after the following dates:

 in England and Wales and in Scotland, 1 October 1992 (by virtue of Criminal Justice Act 1991 (Commencement No 3) Order 1992)
 in Northern Ireland, 9 January 1995 (by virtue of Criminal Justice (1994 Order) (Commencement) Order (Northern Ireland) 1994).

The United Kingdom standard scale was extended in respect of certain offences to two Crown dependencies:

 the Isle of Man, with effect from 1 December 1992 (by virtue of Criminal Justice Act 1982 (Isle of Man) Order 1992).
 Guernsey, with effect from 1 February 1993 (by virtue of Criminal Justice Act 1982 (Guernsey) Order 1992).

Historical 

Before March 2015, the level 5 limit was £5,000. This limit was removed by section 85 of the Legal Aid, Sentencing and Punishment of Offenders Act 2012. The level 1–4 limits were unaffected.

Between 1984 and 1992, the standard scale in England and Wales was as follows:

Hong Kong

 Chapter 221 Criminal Procedure Ordinance, section 113B – Levels of fines for offences
 Chapter 221 Criminal Procedure Ordinance, schedule 8 – Level of fines for offences

Fines specified in prior legislation were converted to points on the standard scale by section 113C.

Above amounts .

Zimbabwe 

 Criminal Penalties Amendment Act 2001, took effect from 20 May 2002

Further reading
 Report on the Indexation of Fines (LRC 37-1991), Law Reform Commission of Ireland, 30 October 1991

See also
 Penalty unit

References

  

English law
Sentencing (law)